Tonghe Subdistrict is a subdistrict in Pingdu, Shandong province, China. , it administers the following five residential neighborhoods and 93 villages:
Neighborhoods
Nancheng
Heping
Gaoping Road
Zhongxing
Tongxin

Villages
Zhongxinzhuang Village
Wangjiashagezhuang Village
Nijiashagezhuang Village
Chaijiashagezhuang Village
Jiangjiashagezhuang Village
Jingjiatuan Village
Cuijiazhuang Village
Xifengtaipu Village
Dongfengtaipu Village
Daguanjiazhuang Village
Houjiazhan Village
Wangjiazhan Village
Lijiazhan Village
Nanshilipu Village
Nandaijiazhuang Village
Lijialou Village
Liujiazhang Village
Yaojia Village
Xiezi Village
Nanzhaike Village
Pangjia Village
Honggounanzhuang Village
Dahonggou Village
Yangjiajinggezhuang Village
Zhangjiajinggezhuang Village
Yaojiajinggezhuang Village
Cuijiajinggezhuang Village
Sunjiazhang Village
Zhengjiazhang Village
Liangjiazhuang Village
Dongsunjiazhuang Village
Nanzhuang Village
Juntun Village
Songjiazhaogezhuang Village
Shijiazhuang Village
Huangjiatuan Village
Dazhaogezhuang Village
Wangjiazhaogezhuang Village
Gouya Village
Shimiao Village
Wangjialiutuan Village
Sunjialiutuan Village
Linjiatuan Village
Ligezhuang Village
Liangjiatuan Village
Sunjiayao Village
Shaojiatuan Village
Yangjiatuan Village
Zhangtuan Village
Aijiatuan Village
Xisunjiazhuang Village
Niugezhuang Village
Xihoujiazhuang Village
Fujiazhuang Village
Daluojia Village
Liugulu Village
Xishijia Village
Xiguojiazhuang Village
Beigaojiazhuang Village
Lujiazhuang Village
Xiwangjiazhuang Village
Renjiazhuang Village
Xilinjiazhuang Village
Nangaojiazhuang Village
Hutiejia Village
Quanlihujia Village
Chenjiawuzi Village
Nanwangjiazhuang Village
Shiliujia Village
Donghoujiazhuang Village
Wujiazhuang Village
Lijiazhuang Village
Damiaozhuang Village
Shitongzhuang Village
Wangjiapozi Village
Gengjiaji Village
Jiangjiazhuang Village
Yuanqianwangtuan Village
Xixingjia Village
Dongxingjia Village
Fujiatuan Village
Dongshijia Village
Xiligezhuang Village
Lijiabuzi Village
Dongsanjia Village
Houwujia Village
Renjiatun Village
Zhailitun Village
Sunjiatuan Village
Huangtuling Village
Tongchenghefu Village
Xiheshun Village
Huali Village

See also 
 List of township-level divisions of Shandong

References 

Township-level divisions of Shandong
Pingdu